Sycamore Valley Regional Open Space Preserve is a regional park in Contra Costa County, California, outside of Danville, California, United States that is part of the East Bay Regional Parks (EBRPD) system.

History
The result was a  tract named the Short Ridge unit. These two names are still used to designate the southern and northern parts of the preserve, respectively.

In the 1980s, the Town of Danville developed the Sycamore Valley Specific Plan to protect open space on the ridge lines south of Mount Diablo to be saved. The plan specified the following goals:
 Maintain the open grasslands as working ranch land;
 Provide trails for public recreation;
 Minimize wildfire risks to neighboring homes; 
 Conserve the native wildlife. 

The park officially opened to the public on September 25, 2005.

References

External links
Sycamore Valley Regional Open Space Preserve official web page

East Bay Regional Park District
Parks in Contra Costa County, California
Danville, California
Protected areas established in 2005
2005 establishments in California